Alberto Spinola (11 May 1943 – c. August 2018) was an Italian water polo player. He competed at the 1964 Summer Olympics and finished in fourth place with the Italian team, contributing two goals in four matches.

References

1943 births
2018 deaths
Olympic water polo players of Italy
Water polo players at the 1964 Summer Olympics
Italian male water polo players